Pancritical rationalism (literally "criticism of all things", from pan-, "all", also known as PCR), also called comprehensively critical rationalism (CCR), is a development of critical rationalism and panrationalism originated by William Warren Bartley in his book The Retreat to Commitment. PCR attempts to work around the problem of ultimate commitment or infinite regress by decoupling criticism and justification. A pancritical rationalist holds all positions open to criticism, including PCR itself. Such a position in principle never resorts to appeal to authority for justification of stances, since all authorities are held to be intrinsically fallible.

References

 William W. Bartley: The Retreat to Commitment (Open Court, 1990), .
 William W. Bartley: Rationality versus the Theory of Rationality. In Mario Bunge (Ed.): The Critical Approach to Science and Philosophy (New York: Free Press, 1964).
 William W. Bartley: The Philosophy of Karl Popper. Part III. Rationality, Criticism, and Logic. Philosophia 11:1–2 (February 1982), 121–221.
 David Miller: Comprehensively Critical Rationalism: A Restatement and Defence. (Open Court, 1994), .
 Gerard Radnitzky, William W. Bartley (Eds.): Evolutionary Epistemology, Rationality and the Sociology of Knowledge (Open Court, 1987), .
 Mariano Artigas: The Ethical Nature of Karl Popper's Theory of Knowledge: Including Popper's unpublished comments on Bartley and critical rationalism (Peter Lang Publishing, 1999), .

External links
Pancritical Rationalism: An Extropic Metacontext for Memetic Progress
Writings on W.W. Bartley
The Bartley Institute

Metaphilosophy
Rationalism
Criticism
Epistemological theories